Max Steel is a science fiction–comedy CGI–animated television series co-produced by Mattel Playground Productions, Nerd Corps Entertainment and FremantleMedia Kids & Entertainment. It is a re-imagining of its 2000-2002 predecessor and both series are based on the Mattel action-figure of the same name. Max Steel premiered on March 25, 2013 and ended on December 6, 2014.

Series overview

Episode list

Season 1 (2013)

Season 2 (2014)

Animated Films (2015)

Animated Films (2016)

Animated Films (2017)

References

Lists of American children's animated television series episodes
Lists of Canadian children's animated television series episodes